Richmond is a provincial electoral district in  Nova Scotia, Canada, that elects one member of the Nova Scotia House of Assembly.

Replacing the former district of Richmond-Cape Breton West, it was created in 1933 when the counties of Cape Breton and Richmond were divided into three new electoral districts. In 1992, it was renamed Richmond. In 2013, at the recommendation of the Electoral Boundaries Commission, the district was renamed Cape Breton-Richmond, gained the town of Port Hawkesbury from Inverness and expanded northeast to include the area east of East Bay and west of the Mira River to Morley Road from Cape Breton West. Following the 2019 electoral boundary review, it lost Port Hawkesbury to Inverness and some territory to Cape Breton East, and reverted to the name Richmond.

A provincial district of Richmond existed from 1867 to 1925. It elected two members, through Block Voting, in this period.

Geography

Members of the Legislative Assembly
Prior to dissolution of the Legislative Assembly, the electoral district was represented by the following Members of the Legislative Assembly:

Election results

1867 general election

1871 general election

1874 general election

1878 general election

1882 general election

1886 general election

1890 general election

1894 general election

1897 general election

1901 general election

1906 general election

1911 general election

1916 general election

1920 general election

1933 general election

1937 general election

1941 general election

1945 general election

1949 general election

1953 general election

1956 general election

1960 general election

1963 general election

1967 general election

1970 general election

1974 general election

1978 general election

1981 general election

1984 general election

1988 general election

1993 general election

1998 general election

1999 general election

2003 general election

2006 general election

2009 general election

2013 general election

|-

|Liberal
|Michel Samson
|align="right"|4,369
|align="right"|56.51
|align="right"|N/A
|-

|Progressive Conservative
|Joe Janega
|align="right"|1,696
|align="right"|21.93
|align="right"|N/A
|-

|New Democratic Party
|Bert Lewis
|align="right"|1,667
|align="right"|21.56
|align="right"|N/A
|}

2017 general election

2021 general election

References

Summary of Official Results by District (2013 election). Elections Nova Scotia, retrieved November 25, 2013.

External links
 2013 riding profile

Nova Scotia provincial electoral districts
2012 establishments in Nova Scotia